Cootamundra is an electoral district of the Legislative Assembly in the Australian state of New South Wales.

Cootamundra is a regional electorate encompassing the local government areas of Bland Shire, Narrandera Shire, Coolamon Shire, Temora Shire, Junee Shire, Weddin Shire, Cowra Shire, part of Hilltops Council and Cootamundra-Gundagai Regional Council.

History 
Cootamundra first existed as an electorate from 1904 to 1941 and elected one member between 1904 and 1920 and between 1927 and 1941. It was created in the 1904 re-distribution of electorates following the 1903 New South Wales referendum, which required the number of members of the Legislative Assembly to be reduced from 125 to 90. It consisted of part of The Murrumbidgee, and parts of the abolished seats of Gundagai, Wagga Wagga and Young.

In 1920, with the introduction of proportional representation, it absorbed Burrangong and Yass and elected three members. Proportional representation was abandoned in 1927 and Young and Temora, were separated from it and Cootamundra reverted to being a single member electorate. It was abolished in 1941.

Cootamundra was recreated for the 2015 state election, combining the western part of the abolished district of Burrinjuck with the eastern part of the abolished district of Murrumbidgee.

Members for Cootamundra

Election results

References

Cootamundra
Cootamundra
1904 establishments in Australia
Cootamundra
1941 disestablishments in Australia
Cootamundra
2015 establishments in Australia